The Embassy of Mauritania in Washington, D.C. is the Islamic Republic of Mauritania's diplomatic mission to the United States. It is located at 2129 Leroy Place N.W. in Washington, D.C.'s Kalorama neighborhood. 

The Ambassador is Mohamedoun Daddah.

Building
Built in 1914 as a private residence, the Georgian Revival-style building is designated as a contributing property to the Sheridan-Kalorama Historic District, listed on the National Register of Historic Places in 1989. Previous occupants include Joseph W. Folk, Charles Cheney Hyde, Frederik Wachmeister, the Embassy of Hungary, the Embassy of Libya, the Polish Trade Mission, and the Embassy of Jamaica.

References

External links

Official website

Mauritania
Washington, D.C.
Sheridan-Kalorama Historic District
Historic district contributing properties in Washington, D.C.
Houses completed in 1914
Mauritania–United States relations